The following is a list of people executed by the U.S. state of Mississippi since capital punishment was resumed in 1976.

Since 1976, 23 people convicted of capital murder have been executed by the state of Mississippi. Of the 23 people executed, 4 were executed via gas chamber and 19 via lethal injection.

See also 
 Capital punishment in Mississippi
 Capital punishment in the United States

Notes 


References

External links 
 Mississippi Department of Corrections

Mississippi

People executed